The Auriscalpiaceae are a family of fungi in the order Russulales. Like much of the Russulales, it has been defined through molecular phylogeny, and includes physically dissimilar species, such as the tooth fungus Auriscalpium and the gilled, often shelf-like members of Lentinellus.

See also
List of Basidiomycota families

References

Russulales
Basidiomycota families